John Lattimore House is a historic home located near Polkville, Cleveland County, North Carolina.  It is a vernacular one-story-with-raised-attic dwelling consisting of a one-room, half-dovetailed log structure dated to the early 19th century, with a frame addition, full-length porch, and rear shed rooms added in the 1820s or 1830s.  It has a gable roof and sits on a fieldstone pier foundation.

It was listed on the National Register of Historic Places in 1982.

References

Log houses in the United States
Houses on the National Register of Historic Places in North Carolina
Houses in Cleveland County, North Carolina
National Register of Historic Places in Cleveland County, North Carolina
Log buildings and structures on the National Register of Historic Places in North Carolina